William Munroe may refer to:

 William Munroe (American soldier) (1742–1827), American soldier in the American Revolutionary War
 William Munroe (pencil maker) (1778–1861), first American pencil maker
 William Munroe (Scottish soldier) (1625–1719), Scottish soldier
 William R. Munroe (1886–1966), United States Navy admiral

See also
William Munro (disambiguation)
Billy Munro (disambiguation)
William Monroe (disambiguation)